St Edmund's may refer to:

 One of many churches named after a Saint Edmund
 Bury St Edmunds, a market town in Suffolk, England
 St Edmund's School, Canterbury
 Other schools named after a Saint Edmund
 St Edmund's College, in the University of Cambridge
 Other colleges named after a Saint Edmund
 St Edmund Hall, in the University of Oxford
 St Edmund's Priory, a former priory in Cambridge
 St Edmund's Township, a former township in Ontario, Canada

See also 

 Saint Edmund (disambiguation)
 St. Edmond's Academy